The 1994 Istanbul mayoral election took place on 27 March 1994 in order to elect the Mayor of the İstanbul Metropolitan Municipality. Additionally, each of the 27 districts of İstanbul elected a district municipal mayor on the same day. The election was held as part of nationwide local elections held on the same day.

The winner of the metropolitan mayoral race was Recep Tayyip Erdoğan, the candidate of the Islamist-oriented Welfare Party, who served until his imprisonment in 1998. Erdoğan later went on to become Prime Minister of Turkey in 2002 and President of Turkey in 2014.

Results 

The full results of the election are shown in the table below.

References 

Elections in Istanbul
1994 elections in Turkey
1990s in Istanbul